Charles Brown (January 15, 1946 – January 8, 2004) was an American actor and a member of New York City, New York theater troupe the Negro Ensemble Company. He was best known for his performances in Off-Broadway and Broadway plays by Samm-Art Williams and August Wilson.

Biography
Charles Brown was born in Talladega, Alabama, and raised in Cleveland, Ohio, the son of Mack Brown Sr. His siblings included brothers Mack Jr. and Ramon and sister Shirley. After serving in the U.S. Navy during the Vietnam War, Brown studied theater at Howard University, in Washington, D.C. He performed with that city's D.C. Black Repertory Company, and elsewhere.

Brown became a regular member of the Negro Ensemble Company, where his roles included Southern farmer Cephus Miles in Samm-Art Williams' Home (1979) and military investigator Captain Richard Davenport in 1944 Louisiana in Charles Fuller's A Soldier's Story (1981). Home moved to Broadway in 1980, earning Brown a Tony Award nomination for Best Actor in a Play. In 2001 he received his second, for Best Featured Actor in a Play, for his role as the gambler and con man Elmore in August Wilson's King Hedley II. That part won him a 2001 Drama Desk Award.

Other stage work includes roles in Neil Simon's Rumors (1988); John Guare's A Few Stout Individuals (2002); Jessica Blank and Erik Jensen's The Exonerated; Don Evans' Showdown; Leslie Lee's First Breeze of Summer (1975); Richard Wesley's The Mighty Gents (1978); Steve Carter's Nevis Mountain Dew; and Wilson's Fences (1987), in which he portrayed the older son of a character played by James Earl Jones. Television credits included the New York City-shot series Kojak, The Cosby Show, Law & Order, Law & Order: SVU, and The Equalizer. In the 1983 TV series Kennedy, he portrayed the civil rights leader Martin Luther King Jr.

Brown was married to Renee Lescook. He died of prostate cancer in Cleveland, Ohio, where he lived.

Partial filmography
Headin' for Broadway (1980) - Pimp
Without a Trace (1983) - Sachs
Trading Places (1983) - Officer Reynolds
Legal Eagles (1986) - Real Cavanaugh
Drop Squad (1994) - Uncle Otha

References

External links

Charles Brown at Internet Off-Broadway Database

1946 births
2004 deaths
African-American male actors
American male film actors
American male stage actors
Drama Desk Award winners
21st-century American male actors
Male actors from Alabama
Male actors from Cleveland
Howard University alumni
United States Navy sailors
20th-century American male actors
Deaths from prostate cancer
Deaths from cancer in Ohio
People from Talladega, Alabama
21st-century African-American people
African-American United States Navy personnel
African Americans in the Vietnam War
20th-century African-American people